Como Park Senior High School (CPSHS or commonly known as CPHS) is a public high school located in the Lake Como area of Saint Paul, Minnesota, United States, serving grades nine through twelve. Along with nine other public high schools, Como Park comprises the Saint Paul Public Schools. Newsweek ranked the school in their "List of the Top High Schools in America" for the fourth time in five years (2006, 2007, 2009, and 2010).

History 

Originally opened in 1957, Como Park Junior High School was converted into a senior high school in the fall of 1979, accepting students from the just closed Washington and Murray High Schools, both of which became junior highs that same year. The school originally began with only three classes - sophomores, juniors, and seniors. The freshman class was added in 1981. Construction was not completed when the school year began. The class of 1985 was the first four-year graduating class.

Renovation 
In early 2016, plans to renovate the Como Park facilities were drafted by a school design committee, with the final plans including redoing artificial turf on the schools sports field, a building addition and interior renovations to create compacity for 100 new students through new education spaces, and a 2-story addition to the building. The construction of these additions first broke ground through early and late 2017, with the returfing of the field being completed the same year while the other projects were not complete until fall of 2020.

Education
Como Park's average score on the ACT exam was 21.2 compared to a state average of 22.6 and a national average of 21.1. 51.56% of students were considered proficient in reading while 22.08% were proficient in math. The school is currently meeting 83.9% of the Adequate Yearly Progress (AYP) requirements but is not meeting AYP due to low proficiency in mathematics. Como Park has an AYP graduation rate of 96%.

Enrollment
Como Park enrolled 1,163 students in its 2020–2021 school year. Of the enrolled, those identifying as African American and Asian students are tied for the plurality at 33%, while 20% identify as Caucasian and 10% as Hispanic. Additionally, American Indian students compose 1% of the population, along with 3% identifying as 2 or more ethnicities. A little more than half, 62%, qualified for Free and Reduced Price Lunch, a measure of poverty. 37% of the students are enrolled in English Language Learning, and 13% are enrolled in special education.

Athletics
Cougar athletic programs compete in Class 4AA of the Minnesota State High School League.

Fall Sports 
 Boys': Cross-Country, Football, Soccer
 Girls': Cross-Country, Soccer, Swimming & Diving, Tennis, Volleyball

Winter Sports 
 Boys': Basketball, Hockey, Nordic Skiing, Swimming & Diving, Wrestling
 Girls': Alpine Skiing, Basketball, Gymnastics, Hockey, Nordic Skiing

Spring Sports 
 Boys': Baseball, Golf, Tennis, Track & Field, Ultimate
 Girls': Badminton, Golf, Softball, Track & Field, Ultimate

State championships 
In 2013, Como Park's boys soccer team won the class A state title in a 2–1 victory against Hill-Murray, earning their first state championship title.

Extracurricular activities

Robotics 
Como Park's robotics team, BEASTBOT#2855, has competed in the FIRST Robotics Competition since 2009. From its founding date until 2019, the team competed in the Minnesota 10000 lakes regional, Minnesota State High School League State Championships, Minnesota Robotics Invitational, Lake Superior Regional and the Minnesota North Star Regional. At these events, they earned the Minnesota 10000 Lakes Regional Entrepreneurship Award in 2016, and in the same year came in first at the Minnesota Robotics Invitational. The team last competed in 2019.

Notable alumni 

Lexii Alijai, rapper
 Josh Blue, stand-up comedian, winner of Last Comic Standing
 Andre Smith, former basketball power forward for North Dakota State University

References

External links
Como Park Senior High School
Saint Paul Public Schools Athletic Department Website

1979 establishments in Minnesota
Educational institutions established in 1979
High schools in Saint Paul, Minnesota
Public high schools in Minnesota